The Pickering House, at 403 N. Glass in Victoria, Texas, was built c.1850s.  In about 1911 it was remodelled to a Classical Revival design by architect Jules Leffland.

It was listed on the National Register of Historic Places in 1986 for its architecture.  The listing included four contributing buildings.

The house has an asymmetrical plan and a two-story porch across its front.  The original house was built for sea captain A. F. Higgs, entrepreneur of the Texas Continental Meat Co., possibly in the 1850s.  Joe M. Pickering, a businessman and co-founder of the Anchor Lumber Co., bought the house in 1908.

It was listed on the NRHP as part of a study which listed numerous historic resources in the Victoria area.

See also

National Register of Historic Places listings in Victoria County, Texas

References

Houses on the National Register of Historic Places in Texas
Neoclassical architecture in Texas
Houses completed in 1855
Houses in Victoria, Texas
National Register of Historic Places in Victoria, Texas